Laurie J. Patterson is an American author and computer science professor.  Her books focus on the lyricists of the Tin Pan Alley era.  She has also published articles on gender and technology.

Biography 
Patterson was born in Westbrook, Minnesota. She attended the University of Minnesota receiving a Bachelor of Arts in Biology and a Master of Education in Training and development focusing on Information Technology training. She received her Doctor of Education from Nova Southeastern University in Computer Information Technology.

Patterson is an Associate Professor in Department of Computer Science at the University of North Carolina Wilmington. From 2013-2017, she served as the Department Chair.

Works
The Songs of Hollywood, with Philip Furia (2010)
The American Song Book: The Tin Pan Alley Era, with Philip Furia (2015)
The Poets of Tin Pan Alley: A History of America's Great Lyricists, 2nd edition Laurie J. Patterson (post-humously 2022)

References

External links
 Laurie J. Patterson, at Department of Computer Science, UNCW

Year of birth missing (living people)
Living people
American computer scientists
University of North Carolina at Wilmington faculty
University of Minnesota College of Liberal Arts alumni
Nova Southeastern University alumni
University of Minnesota College of Education and Human Development alumni